Ornipholidotos tanganyikae is a butterfly in the family Lycaenidae. It is found in Tanzania (Kigoma and Mpanda). The habitat consists of riverine forests at altitudes between 900 and 1,300 metres.

References

Butterflies described in 1983
Ornipholidotos
Endemic fauna of Tanzania
Butterflies of Africa